Westward Ho is an unincorporated community in Alberta, Canada within Mountain View County. It is located approximately 50 kilometers northwest of Calgary, just west of the intersections of Highway 22 and Highway 27 between Olds and Sundre. There is a general store with a gas bar also located here.

Across the highway is a 300 site campground also called Westward Ho with a hall, washrooms, baseball diamonds, beach, playgrounds and many private sites.

Much of Westward Ho (town/campground) is located on the Little Red Deer River.

See also
List of communities in Alberta

Localities in Mountain View County